Haplomitrium is a genus of liverwort.

Species
H. cooperi Nees
H. scalia Nees
H. chilensis Schuster 1971
H. dentatum (Kumar & Udar 1976) Engel 1981
H. giganteum (Stephani 1922) Grolle 1964
H. grollei Kumar & Udar 1977
H. kashyapii Udar & Kumar 1982
 Subgenus (Calobryum) (Nees 1846) Schuster 1967c [Calobryum Nees 1846; Cladobryum Nees ex Endlicher 1840]
 H. (C.) blumei (Nees 1846) Schuster 1963
 H. (C.) mnioides (Lindberg 1875) Schuster 1963
 Subgenus (Haplomitrium) Nees 1833 nom. cons.
 Section Archibryum (Schuster 1967c) Engel 1981
 H. (H.) gibbsiae (Stephani 1917) Schuster 1963
 H. (H.) intermedium Berrie 1962
 Section Haplomitrium Nees 1833 nom. cons.
 H. (H.) andinum Spruce 1885
 H. (H.) monoicum Engel 1981
 H. (H.) ovalifolium Schuster 1971d
 H. (H.) hookeri (Lyell ex Smith 1814) Nees 1833
 H. (H.) h. var. minutum (Campbell 1987) Bartholomew-Began 1991

References
The Plant List

Calobryales
Liverwort genera